The Shahab-1 (meaning "Meteor-1") was the foundation of the short-range Iranian missile program. During the Iran–Iraq War, Iran purchased R-17 Elbrus missiles from Libya, Syria and North Korea (Hwasong-5). It is a close copy of Hwasong-5 (R-17).

Iran began making the Shahab-1 sometime between 1985 to 1988.  Iran's Shahab-1 is a short-range ballistic missile derived from the Scud-B, and has a maximum range of 300km (185 miles).

Iran employed Shahab 1s extensively during the 1990s and early 2000s against Mujahidin-e Khalq Organization (MKO) camps in Iraq.

Variants
Shahab is the name of a class of Iranian missiles, service time of c. 1987–present, which comes in six variants: Shahab-1, Shahab-2, Shahab-3, Shahab-4, Shahab-5, Shahab-6.

Gallery

Operators

See also
 Military of Iran
 Islamic Revolutionary Guard Corps Aerospace Force
 Defense industry of Iran
 List of equipment of the Iranian Army
 Shahab-2
 Shahab-3
 Shahab-4

References

External links
 

Weapons and ammunition introduced in 1987
Medium-range ballistic missiles of Iran
Surface-to-surface missiles of Iran
Tactical ballistic missiles of Iran
Guided missiles of Iran
Theatre ballistic missiles